Eucomis humilis is a species of flowering plant in the family Asparagaceae, subfamily Scilloideae, native to KwaZulu-Natal and Lesotho. It was first described by Baker in 1895. The greenish to purplish flowers appear in summer and are arranged in a spike (raceme), topped by a "head" of green leaflike bracts. Cultivated as an ornamental plant, it can be grown successfully outside where frosts are not too severe.

Description
Eucomis humilis is a short summer-growing bulbous plant. The bases of the leaves are sometimes spotted underneath. The margins are variously described as smooth without undulations or wavy-edged. The raceme is topped by a head or "coma" of short bracts. The somewhat unpleasantly scented flowers have six greenish or purplish tepals, and purple stamen filaments. The ovary and the inflated capsule that develops from it are large and reddish purple in colour.

Taxonomy
Eucomis humilis was first described by John Gilbert Baker in 1895. The specific epithet humilis means low-growing or dwarf. Although relatively short, it is one of the usually larger tetraploid species of Eucomis, with 2n = 2x = 60.

Distribution and habitat
Eucomis humilis is found in the South African province of KwaZulu-Natal and in Lesotho.

Cultivation
Eucomis humilis is grown as an ornamental garden plant. It can be planted in full sun or semi-shade, preferring nutrient-rich, well-drained soils. It tolerates some degree of frost. It can be propagated from seeds, offsets and leaf cuttings.

References

Scilloideae
Plants described in 1895
Flora of Lesotho
Flora of KwaZulu-Natal
Taxa named by John Gilbert Baker